Boris Alexandrov Sports Palace (Borıs Aleksandrov atyndaǵy sport saraıy) is an ice hockey indoor arena in Oskemen, Kazakhstan. The sports palace was renamed after Soviet and Kazakhstani ice hockey player Boris Alexandrov in 2010. It is the home arena of the Kazzinc-Torpedo hockey club.

History
The sports palace was constructed from 1964 to 1968. It was the first stadium in Kazakhstan to utilize a truss in construction. It was also the first ice hockey indoor arena in the Soviet Union to be built with a training ground. Initially, the main arena accommodated 5200 spectators. In 2001, Kazzinc company rebuilt the arena at a cost of three million dollars. After reconstruction, capacity was reduced to 4,400.

References

Indoor ice hockey venues in Kazakhstan
Kazzinc-Torpedo